Kesaoleboga Molotsane (born 8 January 1992) is a South African long-distance runner. In 2019, she competed in the senior women's race at the 2019 IAAF World Cross Country Championships held in Aarhus, Denmark. She finished in 42nd place.

In 2017, she competed in the senior women's race at the 2017 IAAF World Cross Country Championships held in Kampala, Uganda. She finished in 35th place. In the same year, she also competed in the women's 5000 metres event at the 2017 Summer Universiade held in Taipei, Taiwan. She finished in 9th place with a personal best of 16:01.76.

References

External links 
 

Living people
1992 births
Place of birth missing (living people)
South African female long-distance runners
South African female cross country runners
Competitors at the 2017 Summer Universiade